Maria Teresa Rebecca Brambilla better known as Marietta Brambilla (6 June 1807 – 6 November 1875) was an Italian contralto who sang leading roles in the opera houses of Europe from 1827 until her retirement from the stage in 1848. She is best known today for having created the roles of Maffio Orsini in Donizetti's Lucrezia Borgia and Pierotto in his Linda di Chamounix, but she also created several other roles in lesser-known works. She was the elder sister of the opera singers Teresa and Giuseppina Brambilla and the aunt of Teresina Brambilla who was also an opera singer.

Life and career
Brambilla was born in Cassano d'Adda, the daughter of Gerolamo and Angela (née Columbo) Brambilla. She was the eldest of five sisters, all of whom became opera singers. Teresa (1813–1895) was a soprano who created the role of Gilda in Rigoletto. Giuseppina sang both contralto and soprano roles and was married to the tenor Corrado Miraglia. Both had very prominent careers. Annetta (1812–?) and Lauretta (1823–1881) were both sopranos who had lesser careers, appearing primarily in provincial Italian opera houses. 

Marietta Brambilla studied at the Milan Conservatory and made her stage debut in 1827 at Her Majesty's Theatre in London as Arsace in Rossini's Semiramide. She sang in several other operas in London that season as well as giving recitals in other English cities. She returned to Italy in 1828 where she sang at La Fenice in the world premiere of Pietro Generali's Francesca da Rimini. Brambilla made her debut at La Scala in the 1833 world premiere of Donizetti's Lucrezia Borgia as Maffio Orsini, a role he had written expressly for her. He also composed Pierotto in Linda di Chamounix for her and adapted the tenor role of Armando di Gondì in Maria di Rohan for her voice when the opera had its first Paris performance in 1843.

Brambilla retired from the stage in 1848, after which she taught singing in Milan and composed several albums of songs and vocal exercises. She married Count Francesco Furga-Gornini in 1857. The marriage ended with his death four years later. She died of cancer in Milan at the age of 68 and was buried in Cassano d'Adda.

Roles created
Brambilla created the following roles, the majority of which were male characters performed en travesti. She was also the contralto soloist in the first performance of In morte di Maria Malibran de Bériot, a cantata in memory of Maria Malibran jointly composed by Gaetano Donizetti, Giovanni Pacini, Saverio Mercadante, Nicola Vaccai, and Pietro Antonio Coppola which took place at La Scala on 17 March 1837. 
Paolo in Pietro Generali's Francesca da Rimini, La Fenice, Venice, 27 December 1828
Arturo in Carlo Coccia's Rosmunda d'Inghilterra, La Fenice, Venice, 28 February 1829
Maffio Orsini in Gaetano Donizetti's Lucrezia Borgia, La Scala, Milan, 26 December 1833
Enrico Pontigny in Luigi Ricci's Un'avventura di Scaramuccia, La Scala, Milan, 8 March 1834
Bianca in Saverio Mercadante's Il giuramento, La Scala, Milan, 11 March 1837
Guiscarda Obonello in Federico Ricci's Corrado d'Altamura, La Scala, Milan, 16 November 1841
Pierotto in Gaetano Donizetti's Linda di Chamounix, Kärntnertor Theater, Vienna, 19 May 1842
Irene in 's Irene, Teatro San Carlo, Naples, 26 December 1847

Notes

References

Operatic contraltos
1807 births
1875 deaths
19th-century Italian women opera singers
Deaths from cancer in Lombardy
Italian contraltos